Jervis Watson Burdick (born March 8, 1889 - November 11, 1962) was an American track and field athlete who competed in the 1912 Summer Olympics. In 1912 he finished twelfth in the high jump competition.

References

External links
list of American athletes

1889 births
1962 deaths
American male high jumpers
Burials at West Laurel Hill Cemetery
Olympic track and field athletes of the United States
Athletes (track and field) at the 1912 Summer Olympics